The 2005–06 Austrian Football First League season was the 32nd season of second level league football in Austria. It was the fourth season that it used the name Red Zac First League.

Team movements

Promoted to Bundesliga
 SV Ried

Relegated from Bundesliga
 No Teams were relegated1

Promoted from Regionalliga
 SC Schwanenstadt
 FK Austria Wein Amateurs
 FC Kufstein1

Relegated to Regionalliga
 SC Untersiebenbrunn
 SV Wörgl

1SC Bregenz resigned from the Bundesliga and were relegated to the Regionalliga. This left an extra place in the 1st Division which FC Kufstein filled.

Teams

Table

External links
 RSSSF Link
 Weltfussball.de
 Kicker.de

2. Liga (Austria) seasons
Austria
2005–06 in Austrian football